Liberty Township is one of the seventeen townships of Logan County, Ohio, United States. As of the 2010 census, the population was 3,434, up from 3,126 at the 2000 census.

Geography
Located in the southern part of the county, it borders the following townships:
Lake Township - north
Jefferson Township - northeast
Monroe Township - east
Salem Township, Champaign County - south
Harrison Township, Champaign County - southwest
Union Township - west
Harrison Township - northwest

Two municipalities are located in Liberty Township: most of the village of West Liberty, in the south, and part of the city of Bellefontaine, the county seat of Logan County, in the north.

Name and history
Liberty Township was organized in 1836. It is one of twenty-five Liberty Townships statewide.

Government
The township is governed by a three-member board of trustees, who are elected in November of odd-numbered years to a four-year term beginning on the following January 1. Two are elected in the year after the presidential election and one is elected in the year before it. There is also an elected fiscal officer, who serves a four-year term beginning on April 1 of the year after the election, which is held in November of the year before the presidential election. Vacancies in the fiscal officer position or on the board of trustees are filled by the remaining trustees.

In the elections of November 2011, David Turner and Chris Foust were elected without opposition in the elections for the positions of township trustee and fiscal officer respectively.

Transportation
U.S. Route 68 is the most important highway in Liberty Township.  Other significant highways in the township include State Routes 245 and 508.

References

External links
County website
County and township map of Ohio
Detailed Logan County map

Townships in Logan County, Ohio
1832 establishments in Ohio
Populated places established in 1832
Townships in Ohio